Rosalind Bailey (born 1944) is a British actress, known for her portrayal of Sarah Headley (née Lytton) in the 1970s and 1980s BBC television drama When the Boat Comes In.

Bailey has appeared in numerous British television drama series, including Byker Grove, Distant Shores and Burn Up. Her stage work includes playing Miss Mary Shepherd in Alan Bennett’s play The Lady in the Van.

References

External links
 

Living people
English television actresses
1946 births